Seagram (c.1980–1997) was a New Zealand bred Thoroughbred racehorse, famous for his victory in the 1991 Grand National sponsored by his namesake Seagram. This was his only notable victory. He came close to winning the Whitbread and was pulled up at the 27th fence in the 1992 Grand National. He lived in retirement until his death at the age of 17.

Grand National record

Pedigree

References

1980 racehorse births
Grand National winners
Thoroughbred family 18-a
National Hunt racehorses
Racehorses bred in New Zealand
Racehorses trained in the United Kingdom